Tariat (crop) is a sum (district) of Arkhangai Province in central Mongolia. As of 2009 it had a population of 5086 people (mainly Chalcha) in 2009, 644 of whom lived in the village of Tariat.

Geography
To west of the town is Khorgo-Terkhiin Tsagaan Nuur National Park, noted for its striking crater Khorgo.

The Chuluut River flows through the district. In 1977 the Soviet geologist Kavel discovered rock images along the river.

Education
The school in Tariat was attended by the Mongolian Social Democratic Party politician Radnaasümbereliin Gonchigdorj.

References

Populated places in Mongolia
Districts of Arkhangai Province